Monroe Township is an inactive township in Monroe County, in the U.S. state of Missouri.

Monroe Township was established in 1831, taking its name from President James Monroe.

References

Townships in Missouri
Townships in Monroe County, Missouri